Ilaria L. E. Ramelli (born 1973) is an Italian-born historian, academic author, and university professor who specializes in ancient, late antique, and early mediaeval philosophy and theology.

Academic appointments 
After being Professor of Roman History, Ramelli has been Full Professor of Theology and endowed Chair (Angelicum), Humboldt Fellow at Erfurt University, Max-Weber-Kolleg (Max Weber Center), and Fellow of the Royal Historical Society as well as Professor (Durham University, Hon.; KUL) and Senior Member (CCSP, University of Cambridge). She has also been, e.g., Senior Research Fellow in Ancient and Patristic Philosophy (both at Durham University, for two fellowships, and at Corpus Christi College, Oxford), in Hellenic Studies at Princeton University, Fowler Hamilton Fellow at Oxford University.

Awards 
Ramelli has received a number of academic and scientific prizes and awards, including a Forschungspreis from the Humboldt Foundation (2017).

Selected works

As author or co-author 
 I romanzi antichi e il Cristianesimo: contesto e contatti, preface by B.P. Reardon, Madrid, Signifer 2001; Cascade Books, 2012. .
 Le nozze di Filologia e Mercurio, (Il Pensiero occidentale). Bompiani, 2001.
 Allegoria, vol. I, L'età classica, Milan: Vita e Pensiero 2004, Temi metafisici e problemi del pensiero antico Series. . 
 Il βασιλεύς come νόμος ἔμψυχος tra diritto naturale e diritto divino: spunti platonici del concetto e sviluppi di età imperiale e tardoantica (Marcello Gigante International Classics Prize, 2006), Naples: Bibliopolis, 2006, Series: Memoirs of the Italian Institute of Philosophical Studies 34. .
 Hierocles the Stoic: elements of ethics, fragments and excerpts. Brill - Society of Biblical Literature, 2009.
 Terms for eternity: Aiônios and aídios in classical and Christian texts. Gorgias Press, 2013; Berlin: De Gruyter, 2021.
 The Christian Doctrine of Apokatastasis: A Critical Assessment from the New Testament To Eriugena. Brill, 2013.The book was reviewed, e.g., in Theological Studies, Journal of Early Christian History,  The International Journal of the Platonic Tradition. and The Journal of Theological Studies.
 Tempo ed eternità in età antica e patristica: filosofia greca, ebraismo e cristianesimo, Assisi: Cittadella, 2015. .
 Evagrius’ Kephalaia Gnostika, Leiden-Atlanta: Brill-SBL, 2015. Pp. lxxxviii + 434.  (hardback);  (paperback)
 Social justice and the legitimacy of slavery: The role of philosophical asceticism from ancient Judaism to late antiquity. Oxford University Press, 2017. .
 A Larger Hope? 1, prefaced by Richard Bauckham, Cascade Books, 2019.
 Bardaisan of Edessa: A Reassessment of the Evidence and a New Interpretation, Gorgias 2009; De Gruyter 2019.
 Patterns of Women’s Leadership in Ancient Christianity, co-edited, Oxford University Press, 2021.
 Eriugena’s Christian Neoplatonism and its Sources in Patristic and Ancient Philosophy, directed, Leuven: Peeters, 2021.

As contributor 

 "Unconditional Forgiveness in Christianity? Some reflections on ancient Christian sources and practices," in The Ethics of Forgiveness: A Collection of Essays (Routledge Studies in Ethics and Moral Theory). Routledge, 2011.
 "The Universal and Eternal Validity of Jesus' Priestly Sacrifice: The Epistle to the Hebrews in Support of Origen's Theory of Apokatastasis," in A Cloud of Witnesses: The Theology of Hebrews in its Ancient Contexts, edited by Richard Bauckham et al, Bloomsbury T&T Clark, 2008.
 "Divine Power in Origen of Alexandria: Sources and Aftermath," in Divine Powers in Late Antiquity, eds. Anna Marmodoro and Irini Fotini Viltanioti, Oxford: OUP, 2017, 177-198. .
 "Gregory of Nyssa on the Soul (and the Restoration): From Plato to Origen," in Exploring Gregory of Nyssa: Historical and Philosophical Perspectives, eds Anna Marmodoro and Neil McLynn, Oxford: OUP, 2018, 110-141. .
 "Origen," in A History of Mind and Body in Late Antiquity, Cambridge: Cambridge University Press, 2018, 245-266. .
 "Epicureanism and Early Christianity," in Oxford Handbook to Epicurus and Epicureanism, ed. Phillip Mitsis, Oxford: Oxford University Press, 2020, 582-612. .
 "Origen, Evagrius, and Dionysius," in Oxford Handbook of Dionysius the Areopagite, ed. Mark Edwards, Dimitrios Pallis, and Georgios Steiris, Oxford: Oxford University Press, 2022, 94-108.

As editor 
 Musonio Rufo, Diatribe, frammenti e testimonianze, Milan: Bompiani, 2001. Pp. 357. . 
 Anneo Cornuto, Compendio di teologia greca, Milan: Bompiani, 2003, Il Pensiero Occidentale. Pp. 607. . 
 Diogene Laerzio, Vite e dottrine dei più celebri filosofi, co-edited, Milan: Bompiani, 2005, Il Pensiero Occidentale. . 
 Gregorio di Nissa, sull'Anima e la Resurrezione, testo greco a fronte. Milan: Bompiani, 2007.
 Eschilo: Tutti i Frammenti con la Prima Traduzione degli Scolii Antichi e Bizantini, Milan: Bompiani, 2009, Il Pensiero Occidentale. Pp. 2061. . 
 Early Christian and Jewish Narrative: The Role of Religion in Shaping Narrative Forms, edited by Ilaria Ramelli and Judith Perkins, Tübingen: Mohr Siebeck, 2015. 
 Evagrius, the Cappadocians, and Neoplatonism, edited volume, Leuven: Peeters 2017.
 Wiley-Blackwell Companion to World Literature - Volume One: To 600 CE, co-edited, Oxford: Wiley-Blackwell, 2020. 
 T&T Clark Handbook to the Early Church, co-edited, London: T&T Clark Bloomsbury Academic, 2021.
 Lovers of the Soul, Lovers of the Body. Phiilosophical and Religious Perspectives in Late Antiquity, Harvard University Press, 2022.

References

External links 
 Profile at ORCID

British women historians
Italian women historians
American women academics
Fellows of the Royal Historical Society
People from Piacenza
1973 births
Historians of Christianity
Patristic scholars
Living people
Italian women philosophers
British women philosophers
Women theologians
Italian historians of religion
Historians of philosophy
Philosophers of religion
21st-century American women